Sagliano Micca is a comune (municipality) in the Province of Biella in the Italian region Piedmont, located about  northeast of Turin and about  north of Biella.

Sagliano Micca borders the following municipalities: Andorno Micca, Biella, Fontainemore, Gaby, Issime, Miagliano, Piedicavallo, Pralungo, Quittengo, Rosazza, San Paolo Cervo, Tavigliano, Tollegno, Veglio.

Once known only as Sagliano, the city changed name to honour its most famous citizen, Pietro Micca, a hero of the siege of Turin in 1706.

Sagliano Micca is the home of Cappellificio Cervo, distinguished makers of fedora hats.

Twin towns – sister cities
Sagliano Micca is twinned with:

  Minervino Murge, Italy (2009)

References

Cities and towns in Piedmont